The Roman Catholic Diocese of Banjul is a diocese located in the city of Banjul in the Gambia.

History
 January 18, 1848: Father Ronarc'h and Father Warlop, Holy Ghost Fathers, arrive in Banjul
 January 18, 1849: Ronarc'h and Warlop establish the mission of Sainte Marie de Gambie
 May 6, 1931: Established as Mission “sui iuris” of Gambia from the Apostolic Vicariate of Senegambia
 March 8, 1951: Promoted as the Apostolic Prefecture of Bathurst in Gambia
 June 24, 1957: Promoted as Diocese of Bathurst in Gambia
 May 9, 1974: Renamed as Diocese of Banjul

Leadership, in reverse chronogical order
 Bishops of Banjul (Roman rite), below
 Bishop Gabriel Mendy, C.S.Sp. (November 30, 2017 – ...)
 Bishop Robert Patrick Ellison, C.S.Sp. (February 25, 2006 – November 30, 2017)
 Bishop Michael Joseph Cleary, C.S.Sp. (January 24, 1981 – February 25, 2006)
 Bishop Michael Joseph Moloney, C.S.Sp. (May 9, 1974 – November 14, 1980);  see below
 Bishops of Bathurst in Gambia (Roman Rite), below
 Bishop Michael Joseph Moloney, C.S.Sp. (June 24, 1957 – May 9, 1974); see above & below
 Prefects Apostolic of Bathurst in Gambia (Roman Rite), below
 Fr. Michael Joseph Moloney, C.S.Sp. (later Bishop) (1951 – June 24, 1957); see above
 Ecclesiastical Superiors of Gambia (Roman Rite), below 
 Fr. Matteo Farrelly, C.S.Sp. (June 7, 1946 – 1951)
 Fr. Giovanni Meehan, C.S.Sp. (October 16, 1931 – 1946)

References

External links
 GCatholic.org
 Catholic Hierarchy

Roman Catholic dioceses in the Gambia
Christian organizations established in 1931
Roman Catholic dioceses and prelatures established in the 20th century
Banjul